Omni-ID is a vendor of passive UHF Radio-frequency identification (RFID) tags. Founded in 2007  as Omni-ID, Ltd., its products are a range of RFID tags designed to operate in all environments, including on metal and liquids.

History

Founding 

The company is based on a research unit that was formed within QinetiQ, an international defence technology company that was spun off from the former UK government agency Defence Evaluation and Research Agency (DERA) when it was split up in June 2001.

One of the problems the research unit studied was the difficulty reading radio frequency identification (RFID) tags placed close to metals and liquids. On August 22, 2007, Omni-ID was granted UK patent number GB2429878 for an “electromagnetic radiation decoupler. With a working RFID tag that overcame those difficulties, it was decided to commercialize the design by forming a new company, Omni-ID, Ltd., which was launched in March 2007. Initial funding for Omni-ID was provided by Cody Gate Ventures LLP  a technology venture fund created in 2007 by QinetiQ and Coller Capital.  An additional $15 million in Series C funding was provided to Omni-ID by Cody Gate Ventures in February 2009.

Products 

The core principle of the new passive  RFID tag design marketed by Omni-ID was that it contained a complex and proprietary  arrangement of metal layers within the tag which reflected and boosted the signal broadcast from an RFID reader. This allowed the tag to be read accurately even when placed on metal, on a liquid container, or even when immersed. This was confirmed in independent testing in November, 2008.

The company offers five different tag designs: Ultra, Max, Flex, Prox, and Curv. Each has a different read range, based on the trade-off between tag size and performance.

The Ultra tag has the longest read range in the Omni-ID product family; up to 135 ft. with a stationary reader.

The Max tag has a long read range  and is designed for tracking conveyances and outdoor assets. The Max HD is a long-range global tag for use in all geographic regions.

The Flex tag is a thin, low-profile tag that offers a medium read range.

The Prox tag is a small tag with a read range of 4m has the shortest read range  and is often used for tracking high value IT assets.

The Curv tag is a small, flexible tag for use on cylindrical assets.

In October 2008, the company announced a new product, OmniTether, designed to attach RFID tags to items that lacked sufficient surface area for normal attachment methods.

At the same time, the company introduced their Service Bureau product, intended to simplify the RFID tag commissioning process for its customers. Omni-ID prints a barcode on the outer label, along with human-readable information, and commissions tags prior to shipping so they arrive at the customer's facility with inventory and associated EPC coding on each tag.

In November 2008, the company announced Omni-ID On Demand for their Prox RFID tag.  The two-part product allows customers to print, encode and deploy Omni-ID tags as needed. Omni-ID has applied for a patent on the product.

In September 2009, the Ultra tag was introduced, a long range passive tag. Benchmark tests by Martin Bjerre, RFID Global Solution, Inc., demonstrated a read range of 135 ft. with a stationary RFID reader, a record for a passive tag.

RFID Applications 

RFID tag technology is used in supply chain management to improve inventory visibility and asset management tracking. It is also used in transponders that time races, vehicle access control, biometric passports, and in  libraries.

Awards 

In April, 2008, Omni-ID was a finalist and the second runner-up at the RFID Journal Awards.

Omni-ID was awarded the 2009 Asia Pacific Frost & Sullivan Technology Innovation Award for UHF RFID Tags.

HID GLOBAL Acquisition 
2021: HID Global acquired Omni-ID.

https://www.businesswire.com/news/home/20210817005972/en/HID-Global-Acquires-Omni-ID-to-Extend-Its-RFID-Leadership

References

External links 
 Omni-ID corporate website

American companies established in 2007
Companies based in San Mateo County, California
Automatic identification and data capture
Radio-frequency identification companies
Information technology companies of the United States